Hen and chicks (also known as hen-and-chickens, or hen-widdies in the southern United States) is a common name for a group of small succulent plants. They belong to the flowering plant family Crassulaceae, native to southern Europe and northern Africa. The plants grow close to the ground with leaves formed around each other in a rosette, and propagating by offsets. The "hen" is the main, or mother, plant, and the "chicks" are a flock of offspring, which start as tiny buds on the main plant and soon sprout their own roots, taking up residence close to the mother plant.

Plants commonly referred to as "Hens and chicks" include ground-hugging species of Sempervivum (houseleeks) such as Sempervivum 'Pekinese', S. arachnoideum (cobweb houseleek), and S. tectorum (common houseleek), as well as members of the related genus Jovibarba. The name is also used for some species of Echeveria, Sedum and Bergenia although these plants differ significantly from Sempervivum and Jovibarba, and may require different cultivation and care.

Care
Hen and chicks is popular in gardens for its varied and interesting appearance and hardiness. It is grown as container planting or in rock gardens. It does best in well-drained, rocky soil; if they are kept wet, the outer leaves will rot.  Planting them in cactus or succulent soil will prevent your plant from sitting in water and meeting an untimely end. Commercial succulent soil is a good choice. Using a pot that allows for drainage at the bottom will also aid in circulating the moisture, and keep the water from sitting at the bottom (this will prevent root rot). Although it does best in sun, it will grow in light shade.

Medicinal uses
The leaves of hens and chicks have been used as herbal remedies for many years. Freshly pressed leaves may act as a substitute to aloe vera for wounds such as low severity burns, sores, and insect bites. Extracts from leaves have been shown to have some antimicrobial and antioxidant properties. Higher levels of antioxidant compounds are produced after long term stressors such as soil drought.

Gallery

References

See also
Hen and chicken plant
How to Grow Hen & Chicks Succulents

Crassulaceae
Succulent plants
Flora of Europe
Flora of North Africa
Garden plants of Europe
Drought-tolerant plants
Groundcovers
Plant common names